Giovanni Francesco della Rovere (died 1517) was a Roman Catholic prelate who served as Archbishop of Turin (1515–1517) and Bishop of Turin (1504–1515).

Biography
On 10 May 1504, Giovanni Francesco della Rovere was appointed during the papacy of Pope Julius II as Coadjutor Bishop of Turin.
In August 1510, he succeeded to the bishopric. 
On 21 May 1515, he was named during the papacy of Pope Leo X as Archbishop of Turin after the diocese was elevated.
He served as Archbishop of Turin until his death in 1517.

References

External links and additional sources
 (for Chronology of Bishops) 
 (for Chronology of Bishops) 

16th-century Italian Roman Catholic bishops
Bishops appointed by Pope Julius II
Bishops appointed by Pope Leo X
1517 deaths
16th-century Italian Roman Catholic archbishops
Della Rovere family